Mahoe Buildings Ltd v Fair Investments Ltd [1994] 1 NZLR 281 is a cited case in New Zealand regarding  the doctrine of part performance.

Background
Mahoe leased a building from Fair Investments. At the end of the 4 years lease, both parties agreed orally to renew the lease.

However, as such leases to be legally enforceable under the Contracts Enforcement Act [1956], they must be in writing, and not merely agreed orally.

Later, one of the parties tried to get out of the lease, on the basis that it was not legally enforceable as the lease renewal was not put in writing.

The other party claimed, that even though it was not put in writing, the lease was still legally enforceable due to the doctrine of part performance.

Held
The court ruled that the doctrine of part performance applied here, making the renewal of the lease legally enforceable.

References

Court of Appeal of New Zealand cases
New Zealand contract case law
1994 in New Zealand law
1994 in case law